William Ross Bond (December 4, 1918 – April 1, 1970) was a United States Army brigadier general who was killed by an enemy sniper in 1970 while commanding the 199th Infantry Brigade in South Vietnam. General Bond also served in World War II with the Army Rangers and was a prisoner of war.

Early life and education
William Ross "Billy" Bond was raised in Maryland and Virginia. He graduated from the University of Maryland with a bachelor's degree in political science and history. He was also a graduate of the Army War College and other senior service schools.

US Army career
Bond enlisted in the Army in 1940. He participated in the Allied invasion of Sicily and later led his company in the Salerno landings in September 1943. On January 22, 1944, Bond's unit landed at Anzio. In a night attack at Cisterna, Bond was awarded the Silver Star, but was captured by the Germans and was held in a prisoner of war camp in Poland.
 
Bond began his first tour in South Vietnam in 1959 as a part of the U.S. Military Assistance Advisory Group.

In 1966, he became Chief of Staff. In 1969 he was awarded the Distinguished Service Medal.

Personal life
Bond married Theodora Sedgwick in 1960, a distant descendant of Union General John Sedgwick who was killed by a Confederate sharpshooter at the Battle of Spotsylvania Court House in 1864.

Death

His funeral was held at Arlington National Cemetery, after which he was buried in Sedgwick Pie at the Stockbridge Cemetery in Stockbridge, Massachusetts.

See also
U.S Army general officers killed in action in the Vietnam War:
George W. Casey, Sr.
John A. B. Dillard
Richard J. Tallman
Keith L. Ware

References

1918 births
1970 deaths
United States Army generals
American military personnel killed in the Vietnam War
United States Army personnel of World War II
Burials in Massachusetts
People from Maryland
People from Virginia
Recipients of the Distinguished Service Medal (US Army)
Recipients of the Silver Star
Sedgwick family
United States Army War College alumni
University System of Maryland alumni
World War II prisoners of war held by Germany
American prisoners of war in World War II
United States Army personnel of the Vietnam War